Beruti may refer to:
 Antonio Beruti (1772-1841), Argentine revolutionary
 3179 Beruti, a minor planet

See also